Land of Broken Dreams is a song written by Thomas G:son and Thomas "Plec" Johansson, and performed by Dynazty at Melodifestivalen 2012, participating in the fourth semifinal in Malmö, successfully progressing to Andra chansen, where it was knocked out by the Top Cats song Baby Doll.

The song was tested for Svensktoppen on 11 and 18 March 2012, but failed to enter that chart.

Chart trajectories

References

2012 singles
English-language Swedish songs
Songs written by Thomas G:son
Melodifestivalen songs of 2012
2012 songs